James Aubrey (Seamus) Deakin (19 June 1874 – 10 December 1952) was an Irish nationalist and member of the Irish Republican Brotherhood (IRB), of which he was president from 1913 to 1914.

Biography
He was born at Mount Auburn, Richmond, Dublin, the son of James Deakin, a traveller, and Mary Anne Tate. His family was Church of Ireland. In 1901, he was living at 27 Millmount Avenue, Drumcondra, with his wife, Catherine, a Scottish-born Presbyterian. Ten years later, the couple was living at 37 Thomond Terrace, Inn's Quay, Dublin, with their three children.

Deakin worked as a chemist in Hoyt's pharmacy in O'Connell Street and later owned his own shop in Phibsborough. Deakin became involved in the Irish nationalist movement during the early 1900s, along with other Protestant nationalists such as George Irvine, Ernest Blythe and Seán O'Casey, and within a short time became a high-ranking member in the Drumcondra branch of the Irish Republican Brotherhood. In 1913, he succeeded John Mulholland as president of the IRB before acceding to Denis McCullough the following year. Deakin resigned from the Supreme Council and from the IRB about August 1914.

It is a common belief that he emigrated to the US, but that is almost certainly not true. He died of a coronary thrombosis on 10 December 1952 in Drumcollogher, County Limerick – where he had moved from Dublin about a decade previously – and was buried in the local cemetery.

Further reading
Martin, Francis X. The Irish Volunteers, 1913–1915: Recollections and Documents. Dublin: James Duffy & Co., 1963.

References

1874 births
1952 deaths
Early Sinn Féin politicians
Irish Anglicans
Irish Republican Army (1919–1922) members
Members of the Irish Republican Brotherhood
Protestant Irish nationalists